Synodontis multipunctatus, also known as the cuckoo catfish, cuckoo squeaker, or multipunk, is a small catfish from Lake Tanganyika, one of the lakes in the Great Rift Valley system in Africa. It is a brood parasite upon mouthbrooding cichlids.  This species grows to a length of  TL.  This species is a minor component of local commercial fisheries.

General

Synodontis multipunctatus is one of a number of species of upside-down catfish in Lake Tanganyika, which is more famous for its cichlids.

S. multipunctatus is notable for its breeding behaviour - it is a brood parasite, similar to the cuckoo from which it takes its common name. Lake Tanganyika is home to a number of mouthbrooding cichlids, which care for their eggs and young by carrying them in their mouth. S. multipunctatus uses these, particularly Ctenochromis horei and Simochromis babaulti, as unwitting caretakers for their children.

The smell of spawning cichlids excites S. multipunctatus into spawning, and as the cichlids lay their eggs the catfish will quickly slip in and eat its eggs before they can be collected by the mother. While doing so they also release and fertilise their own eggs. The female cichlid will hastily attempt to scoop up her eggs and, in doing so, will also collect eggs from S. multipunctatus. These eggs will then hatch inside the unwilling adoptive mother's mouth, and proceed to eat the cichlid eggs present before being released by the cichlid. This technique removes the burden of parental care from the S. multipunctatus, and allows them to breed again sooner.

In the aquarium

Synodontis multipunctatus are a popular addition to cichlid aquariums. Some aquarists have had success with host cichlids from Lake Malawi and Lake Victoria as well as those from Lake Tanganyika. They can be very aggressive and territorial towards other Synodontis species, they should be kept in groups over 3 to avoid competition between two, and proper cover and cave-like structures should be provided. They seem to be active in the day as much as the night and can prove quite lively. If kept in larger groups territorial issues are less likely.

See also
List of freshwater aquarium fish species
Synodontis multipunctatus was featured in the "Interesting Fauna" section of Episode 292 of the 'Geologic Podcast' by George Hrab.

References

Further reading
 Tanganyika cichlids in their natural habitat, Ad Konigs, Cichlid Press, 1998
 Lake Tanganyika cichlids: A complete pet owners manual, Mark P. Smith, Barron's Educational Services, 1998

External links 

multipunctatus
Brood parasites
Freshwater fish of Africa
Fish of Lake Tanganyika
Fish of Burundi
Fish of the Democratic Republic of the Congo
Fish of Tanzania
Fish of Zambia
Taxa named by George Albert Boulenger
Fish described in 1898